The Critics' Choice Movie Award for Best Supporting Actress is an award given out at the annual Critics' Choice Movie Awards. The awards are presented by the Critics Choice Association (CCA), and were first presented in 1995 with Mira Sorvino being the first recipient for her role in Mighty Aphrodite. There were no official nominees announced until 2001. There have been two ties in this category (1998, 2005), and there are currently six nominees annually.  

Joan Allen is the only actress who has received this award more than once, with two wins. Amy Adams holds the record of most nomination in the category with four.

Winners and nominees

1990s

2000s

2010s

2020s

Multiple nominees

2 nominations

 Joan Allen
 Kathy Bates
 Jessica Chastain
 Viola Davis
 Ann Dowd
 Vera Farmiga
 Holly Hunter
 Catherine Keener
 Nicole Kidman
 Frances McDormand
 Janelle Monáe
 Octavia Spencer
 Emma Stone
 Meryl Streep
 Tilda Swinton
 Marisa Tomei
 Rachel Weisz
 Michelle Williams

3 nominations
 Cate Blanchett
 Scarlett Johansson
 Kate Winslet

4 nominations
 Amy Adams

Multiple winners
2 wins
 Joan Allen

See also
 Academy Award for Best Supporting Actress
 BAFTA Award for Best Actress in a Supporting Role
 Independent Spirit Award for Best Supporting Female
 Golden Globe Award for Best Supporting Actress – Motion Picture
 Screen Actors Guild Award for Outstanding Performance by a Female Actor in a Supporting Role

References

External links
 Critics' Choice Movie Awards (official site)

A
Film awards for supporting actress